The 1896–97 Ottawa Hockey Club season was the club's 12th season of play. Ottawa placed second in the league.

Team business 
Directors
 P. D. Ross – Honorary president
 A. Z. Palmer – Honorary vice-president
 S. M. Rogers – President
 C. Kirby – Vice-president
 J. P. Dickson – Secretary
 G. P. Murphy – Treasurer
 F. C. Chittick – Captain
 W. A. Cox, H. Westwick, Fred White – Executive committee

Source:

Season

Highlights 

Fred Chittick was the league's leading goaltender, only allowing 2.3 goals per game. Former captains Chauncy Kirby and Bert Russel retired from the team.

The Ottawa club moved to the new Dey's Skating Rink. In the first game in the new rink, it was inaugurated with the Governor General, the Earl of Aberdeen and his wife, the Countess of Aberdeen in attendance.

Final standing

Schedule and results 

† Protested by Ottawa who scored the tying goal in last few seconds but the goal was disallowed by the referee. The protest was upheld and the game replayed.

‡ Replay of January 30 protested game.

Goaltending averages

Scoring Leaders

Awards and records

Transactions

Roster 
 Fred Chittick – goal
 William Dey
 Howard Hutchison
 Alf Living
 Harvey Pulford
 Alf Smith
 Daniel "Moxie" Smith
 Charlie Spittal
 Harry Westwick
 Weldy Young

See also 

 1897 AHAC season

References 

 

Ottawa Senators (original) seasons
Ottawa